Progress 3 was an unmanned Progress cargo spacecraft launched by the Soviet Union in 1978 to resupply the Salyut 6 space station. It used the Progress 7K-TG configuration, and was the third Progress mission to Salyut 6. It carried supplies for the EO-2 crew aboard Salyut 6, as well as equipment for conducting scientific research, and fuel for adjusting the station's orbit and performing manoeuvres.

Spacecraft

Progress 3 was a Progress 7K-TG spacecraft. The third of forty three to be launched, it had the serial number 103. The Progress 7K-TG spacecraft was the first generation Progress, derived from the Soyuz 7K-T and intended for unmanned logistics missions to space stations in support of the Salyut programme. On some missions the spacecraft were also used to adjust the orbit of the space station.

The spacecraft were powered by chemical batteries, and could operate in free flight for up to three days, remaining docked to the station for up to thirty.

Launch and docking
Progress 3 was launched at 22:31:22 UTC on 7 August 1978, atop a Soyuz-U 11A511U carrier rocket flying from Site 31/6 at the Baikonur Cosmodrome in the Kazakh Soviet Socialist Republic. The rocket that launched it had the serial number Ye15000-138. Following launch, Progress 3 was given the COSPAR designation 1978-077A, whilst NORAD assigned it the Satellite Catalog Number 10999.

Following launch, Progress 3 began two days of free flight. It subsequently docked with the aft port of the Salyut 6 space station at 23:59:30 UTC on 9 August 1978. At the time of its docking, Soyuz 29 was docked to the forward port of the station.

Mission
Progress 3 was the third of twelve Progress spacecraft used to supply the Salyut 6 space station between 1978 and 1981. It delivered cargo to the station, including food, fur boots, and Kovalyonok's guitar. Whilst Progress 3 was docked, Salyut 6 was manned by the EO-2 crew, consisting of cosmonauts Vladimir Kovalyonok and Aleksandr Ivanchenkov.

Progress 3 undocked from Salyut 6 at 15:42:50 UTC on 21 August 1978. It remained in orbit until the late afternoon of 23 August 1978, when it was deorbited. The deorbit burn occurred at 16:45:00 UTC, with the spacecraft undergoing a destructive reentry at around 17:30 UTC. Less than a few weeks after Progress 3 had been deorbited, Progress 4 was launched to replace it.

See also

 1978 in spaceflight
 List of Progress missions
 List of uncrewed spaceflights to Salyut space stations

References

1978 in the Soviet Union
Progress (spacecraft) missions
Spacecraft launched in 1978
Spacecraft which reentered in 1978
Spacecraft launched by Soyuz-U rockets